The 1997–98 Gamma Ethniki was the 15th season since the official establishment of the third tier of Greek football in 1983. Ialysos Rodos and PAS Giannina were crowned champions in Southern and Northern Group respectively, thus winning promotion to Beta Ethniki. Agios Nikolaos and Pierikos also won promotion as a runners-up of the groups.

Pamisos Messini, Ergotelis, Kerkyra, Agia Eleousa, Korinthos, Pyrgos, Orfeas Alexandroupoli, Tyrnavos, Orestis Orestiada, Agrotikos Asteras, Apollon Larissa and Anagennisi Arta were relegated to Delta Ethniki.

Southern Group

League table

Northern Group

League table

References

Third level Greek football league seasons
3
Greece